The red adder (Bitis rubida) is a viper species found only in Western Cape Province, South Africa. No subspecies are currently recognised. Like all other vipers, it is venomous.

Taxonomy
Bitis rubida was described as a new species in 1997 by William Roy "Bill" Branch. Prior to that time, specimens of this snake had been identified as belonging to several other species and subspecies of the genus Bitis (see "Synonyms" in "Taxobox"). The type locality given is "Jeep track above Farm Driehoek, Cederberg Mountains, Western Cape Province, South Africa; 32°25'44"S, 19°12'30"E, alt. 1380 m [4,528 ft]; 3219AC."

The common name is "red adder".Description

Distribution and habitat
Several isolated populations are found in the northern Cape Fold Mountains and inland escarpment in Western Cape Province, South Africa.

References

Further reading
Branch WR. 1997. A new adder (Bitis; Viperidae) from the Western Cape Province, South Africa. South African Journal of Zoology 32 (2): 37-42.
Branch, Bill. 2004. Field Guide to Snakes and Other Reptiles of Southern Africa. Third Revised edition, Second impression. Sanibel Island, Florida: Ralph Curtis Books. 399 pp. . (Bitis rubida'', p. 117 + Plate 14).

External links
 
 Bitis rubida image at ARKive, Reptiles. Accessed 2 October 2006.

Bitis
Endemic reptiles of South Africa
Snakes of Africa
Reptiles described in 1997
Taxa named by William Roy Branch